Other People's Songs is the eighth studio album by Chicago musician Mike Kinsella under the moniker Owen. Announced on October 2, 2014, the album was released on December 2, 2014. It includes covers of songs from artists including Against Me!, Depeche Mode, The Promise Ring, Lungfish and more.

Track listing

References

2014 albums
Owen (musician) albums
Polyvinyl Record Co. albums
Covers albums